Plateau State Government is the government of Plateau State, concerned with the administration of the state ministries.

The government consists of the executive, legislative and Plateau State Judiciary. 

The government is headed by the Plateau State Governor who is the policy-maker and often assisted by the commissioners and other civil servants of the state.

Office of the Governor
The Office of the Governor was created along with the creation of the state in 1976.  It is currently headed by Simon Lalong. This office is responsible for the effective coordination of all government activities for the good of the people of the State.

Judiciary
The Judiciary is one of the three co-equal arms of the Lagos State Government. It is concerned with the interpretation of the laws of Lagos State government.

It is currently headed by Justice Peter Mann.

Legislature
The legislature or state house assembly is one of the three co-equal arms of the State Government concerned with lawmaking. The legislature consists of elected members from each constituency of the state. The head of the legislature, Plateau State House of Assembly is the Speaker, Yakubu Yakson Sanda who is elected by the house.

Executive
The executive branch is one of the three co-equal arms of the State Government, concerned with policy making and implementation of bills. Members of the executive include the Governor, Deputy governor, and commissioners. There are also other top officials of the state, such as the head of service.
The executives overseas the ministries. Each ministry is headed and coordinated by a commissioner, assisted by a permanent secretary.

References

 
Plateau State